Baweja may refer to:

People
 Harry Baweja (born 1956), Indian film director; husband of Pammi
 Pammi Baweja, Indian film producer; wife of Harry
 Harman Baweja (born 1980), Indian actor and dancer; son of Harry and Pammi

Other uses
 Baweja Movies, an Indian film production company owned by Harry and Pammi Baweja